Oak Park is an estate in County Carlow, Republic of Ireland, located  north of the town of Carlow. The estate was purchased by Irish MP Henry Bruen in 1775. It remained in the family until 1957, being inhabited by Bruen's son and grandson, both MPs of the Parliament of the United Kingdom of Great Britain and Ireland. 

The site includes several structures listed on the Irish National Inventory of Architectural Heritage:
 The Oakpark Graveyard (c. 1700–1750), with remains of a church built c. 1725
 The Oak Park House (built c. 1740–1780), a five-bay, two-storey Classical-style country house, designed by Richard Morrison and his son William Vitruvius Morrison. The house was renovated in 1832 and again in 1876, and is now used as a school.
 A two-storey stable complex (built c. 1750–1780), renovated in 1985
 A Classical triumphal arch (built c. 1830–1840), designed by the Morrisons
 A single-arch cast-iron bridge (built c. 1830–1840), designed by George Papworth
 A mausoleum (built c. 1840–1845; now ruined), designed by John B. Keane in the Greek Revival temple style
 A dairy house (built c. 1840–1860)

 of the site are now operated by the Carlow Tourist Office as Oak Park Forest Park. The admission-free park, which features  of nature trails, won a Royal Dublin Society Irish Forestry Award in 2013.

Oak Park also hosts a  "national centre for tillage and bio-energy crops research", operated by Teagasc.

Col. Henry Bruen supplied the oak for the great-framed roof of the Cathedral of the Assumption, Carlow from nearby Oak Park.

See also
Carlow County Museum
Duckett's Grove
List of country houses in County Carlow

References

External links
Bruen of Oak Park Papers in the National Library of Ireland Catalogue

Geography of County Carlow
Buildings and structures in County Carlow
Parks in County Carlow